Golubkina is a crater on Venus.

Golubkina is characterized by terraced inner walls and a central peak, typical of large impact craters on the Earth, Moon, and Mars. The terraced inner walls form at late stages in the formation of an impact crater, due to collapse of the initial cavity formed by the meteorite impact. The central peak forms due to rebound of the inner crater floor.

The smoothness of the floor may be due to pounding of volcanic lava flows in the crater floor. The rough, blocky morphology of the crater ejecta and the sharp terraced crater wall suggest that this feature is relatively young.

References

Impact craters on Venus